David Thomas Flaherty (December 9, 1928 – December 20, 2020) was an American businessman and politician.

Early life 
David Thomas Flaherty was born on December 9, 1928, in Boston, Massachusetts, United States. He graduated from The English High School and served in the U.S. Army. He then attended Boston University, where he was elected student body president before graduating in 1956 with a degree in business administration. While his parents were Catholics and members of the Democratic Party, Flaherty converted to Methodism and became a member of the Republican Party. He later said of these differences, "I just didn't like being told what to do." He married Nancy Hamill on December 6, 1953, and had several children with her. In 1955 he moved to Lenoir, North Carolina after being hired by Broyhill Furniture as an assistant sales manager. He later became manager of the company's advertising division and head of its plastics division.

Political career 
Since Broyhill Furniture's owner, James Edgar Broyhill, was heavily involved in Republican politics, Flaherty decided to get involved in the state chapter. By 1960 he was involved in the North Carolina Young Republicans and campaigned for Robert L. Gavin in the 1960 gubernatorial election. He was elected to the North Carolina Senate in 1968 and 1970, representing Burke and Caldwell Counties. As the body was under Democratic control and hostile to Republican proposals, he had little impact on state legislation.

Flaherty supported James Holshouser in the 1972 gubernatorial election. After Holshouser won, he appointed Flaherty Secretary of the Department of Human Resources (DHS) on January 5, 1973. He served until 1976 and restructured the department during his tenure. He ran as a candidate for governor in 1976. At this time the North Carolina Republican Party was divided between a moderate group led by Holshouser and a more conservative group led by U.S. Senator Jesse Helms. Flaherty expended significant resources to defeat conservative Coy Privette in the Republican primary election, and faced Democratic Lieutenant Governor Jim Hunt in the general election. Hunt largely ignored Flaherty and campaigned on his own issues, defeating him with 65 percent of the vote in the November election. Flaherty quickly conceded and congratulated Hunt on receiving the "mandate from the people he asked for". He chaired the North Carolina Republican Party before becoming chairman of the Employment Security Commission and then Secretary of DHS under Governor James G. Martin.

Later life 
Flaherty's wife died in 2019. He died on December 20, 2020, at his home in Cary, North Carolina after several years of declining health.

References

Works cited 
 
 
 
 

1928 births
2020 deaths
State political party chairs of North Carolina
North Carolina Republicans
Politicians from Boston
State cabinet secretaries of North Carolina